Anoop Chandola (born 24 December 1937) is an American linguist-anthropologist, originally from Pauri (Uttarakhand, India), where he was raised in a priestly Brahmin family. Though his father and uncles broke their ancestral polygamous tradition he suffered from the aftereffects of polygamy.

His father Satya Prasad was a World War II veteran of the Indo-British Army. He refused to shoot any Japanese soldier. The Indo-British army could have court-martialed him. Instead, they made him the Canteen Manager. He liked the job and thanked the Indo-British Army as he enjoyed whisky and cigarettes in the Canteen. However, his mother Kishori warned him not to drink and smoke!

Chandola was educated at the Christian Messmore Intermediate College of Pauri. After completing a year of intermediate education he joined the D.A.V. College of Lucknow for his second and last year of Intermediate.

Before moving to the United States in 1959, Chandola was educated at the University of Allahabad and graduated with a B.A. in Economics, Sanskrit, and English literature. From the University of Lucknow, he received an M.A. in Hindi literature. Inspired by his classmates Nadir Ali Khan (later a professor of Urdu at Aligarh Muslim University) and C. M. Naim ( later a professor of South Asian Studies at the University of Chicago) Chandola started studying linguistics at the Indian School of Linguistics held at Deccan College, Pune. There he was taught Indo-Aryan linguistics by Professors Suniti Kumar Chatterjee and Sukumar Sen. He subsequently obtained an M.A. in linguistics from the University of California, Berkeley, and a Ph.D. in linguistics from the University of Chicago. He received a Ford Foundation Scholarship to study at the University of Chicago. As a graduate student at Berkeley and Chicago, he developed the Hindi teaching program with Professors John Gumperz and Norman Zide. Among his mentors are Professors Prabodh Pandit (Universities of Gujarat and Delhi), John Gumperz (UC Berkeley), Edward Dimock, Norman Zide, K.C. Bahl, A. K. Ramanujan (University of Chicago), and Charles Ferguson (Stanford). The professors who taught him Vedic literature are Kshetresh Chandra Chattopadhyay (University of Allahabad), Murray B. Emeneau (UC Berkeley), and George Bobrinskoy (University of Chicago). While a graduate student at Chicago he claimed in his paper "Animal Commands and their Linguistic Implications" (Word, Issue 2, 203-207, 1963) that languages such as Garhwali contain peripheral linguistic features found in certain behaviors, such as communicating with domestic or wild animals. His Ph.D. dissertation (1965) presents the first syntax of Garhwali, a central Pahari language of the Indo-Aryan group. He is one of the founders of the Linguistics Program at the University of Arizona. At the University of Arizona, he developed a Hindi program where he taught Hindi with his new method of language teaching. He named this method "Language-Culture Lab" where students perform various native cultural activities speaking the native language only. He also taught Indo-European linguistics which he studied with Professors Madison Beeler and Murray B. Emeneau (of Berkeley), Sydney Allen (of Cambridge), and Eric Hamp (of Chicago). He learned the Garhwali folk music from the Dalit drummers, dancers, and singers of the Garhwal Himalayas. Thus came his seminal research of the Garhwali "pandau" ( a rap dance-music based on the ancient Mahabharata epic).

His writings reflect his pro-Dalit (the socially suppressed classes) and pro-women stand. Religion is responsible for his stand. In his opinion religion is an alternate reality—a cultural construct for the purpose of "behavioral satisfaction." He considers religion and science as part of parallel belief systems—the former is based on superstition and the latter on logic. His other stand is for animal rights.

He and his wife Sudha (author of the book "Entranced by the Goddess: Folklore in North Indian Religion") live in Tucson and also in Renton (near Seattle) with their granddaughter Prasha, and son Manjul Varn Chandola ( a Seattle/Tacoma lawyer).

Career

Chandola has taught Indian literature, culture, mythology, and religion at several universities in India and the US, including Sardar Patel University, the M.S. University of Baroda, the University of California-Berkeley, University of Washington-Seattle, University of Texas-Austin, and University of Wisconsin–Madison. His basic training of Indian music in the U.S.A. comes from musicians Zakir Hussain (Tabla), Aashis Khan (vocal), and Rajeshwari Dutta (vocal).

He is a member of the American Anthropological Association, Association for Asian Studies, Linguistics Society of America, and Linguistic Society of India.

Though he retired as Professor Emeritus of East Asian Studies at the University of Arizona in 2003, his writing career continues. He is a frequent guest lecturer on Hinduism and related religions. He is listed in Marquis Who's Who as a recipient of Albert Nelson Marquis Lifetime Achievement Award.

Chandola has written scholarly books and articles primarily in the areas of linguistics, music, religion, and literature which includes extensive interdisciplinary and theoretical analysis. Publication of his seminal work "Folk Drumming in the Himalayas: A Linguistic Approach to Music" was supported in 1973-1974 by a grant from the National Science Foundation (Anthropology Program). This book and several papers advanced a new interdisciplinary field that he named "Musicolinguistics." Some of these papers include " Metalinguistic structure of Indian Drumming: a study in Musico-linguistics", Language and Style, II (4) : 288-295; "Some Systems of Musical Scales and Linguistic Principles", Semiotica, 2.135-150 (1970); "Aspects of Drum Knowledge amongst Musicians in Garhwal, North India", European Bulletin of Himalayan Research 63, p. 72; "Stress Behavior in Musicolinguistics", The Performing Arts (World Anthropology), Proceedings of IX International Congress of Anthropological and Ethnological Sciences, ed., The Hague: Mouton (1979); "Musicolinguistics in Literary Esthetics" (in the festschrift for Archibald Hill). 
His Hindi publications and citations are not listed here.

His researches in Musicolinguistics have been favorably reviewed in the leading journals of anthropology, ethnomusicology, and linguistics. He holds that his use of the term "Musicolinguistics" containing the prefix "Musico-" before "-linguistics" also suggests the evolution of music, e.g. humming, before language.
Chandola is also a novelist who covers multicultural themes. The motto of his novels is "inform and reform" (info-refo) with which he debunks harmful Indian religious traditions and advocates secular egalitarian society. An example is his latest novel "Mutilating Women", a Himalayan story predating the "Me-Too" revolution of abused women.

Academic books
 "Hindi Newspaper Reader" With Colin P. Masica, C.M. Naim, John Roberts (University of Chicago)
 "The Poems of Surdas" With S. M. Pandey and Norman H. Zide (University of Chicago)
 "A Premchand Reader" With Norman H. Zide, Colin P. Masica, K.C. Bahl (East-West Center Press, Honolulu)
 Music As Speech: An Ethnomusicolinguistic Study of India (Published by Navrang Publishers, New Delhi)
 The Way to True Worship: Popular Story of Hinduism  (Published by The University Press of America, Lanham, New York City, London)
 Folk Drumming in the Himalayas: Linguistic Approach to Music  (Published by The AMS Press. Research supported by the US National Science Foundation)
 Systematic Translation of Hindi-Urdu into English (Published by The University of Arizona Press)
 Situation to Sentence: Evolutionary Method for Descriptive Linguistics (Published by AMS Press, New York)
 Contactics: The Daily Drama of Human Contact (Published by The University Press of America)
 On the non-existence of phrase and transformation : VP and the brain operations  (Published by The University of North Carolina)
 Mystic and Love Poetry of Medieval Hindi: With Introduction, Texts, Grammar, Notes, Translations and Glossary (Published by Today's and Tomorrow's Scholarly Press, New Delhi)

Novels

 In the Himalayan Nights  (Published by Savant Books and Publications LLC , March 2012)
 The Dharma Videos of Lust: Mysteries of Indian Religions  (Published by UKA Press , October 26, 2005)
 The Second Highest World War: The Rama Theater  (Published by iUniverse , April 2, 2002)
 Discovering Brides  (Published by iUniverse , July 21, 2000)
 "Myth and Punishment" (Published by Black Opal Books, July 15, 2017)
 "Mutilating Women" (Published by Black Opal Books), January 19, 2019

Reviews, awards, and interviews

 Finalist, The Best Books Awards, USA Book News, for "The Dharma Videos of Lust," 2006. 
 Finalist, the National Indie Excellence Awards for "The Dharma Videos of Lust," 2009
 Finalist, ForeWord Reviews Awards for "In the Himalayan Nights," 2013
 Honorable Mention Award of Great Northwest Book Festival for "In the Himalayan Nights," 2013
 Honorable Mention Award of the New England Book Festival for "Myth and Punishment," 2018
 Anoop Chandola interview, Anil Aggrawal  Internet Journal of Book Reviews 
 "The Dharma Videos of Lust" reviewed  by Arup Chakraborty, Hindustan Times, by Alexis Blue Lo Que Pasa; by J.C. Martin The Arizona Daily Star; Ellen Tanner Marsh, Best Seller Author of New York Times;  Michael Witzel, the Wales Professor of Sanskrit and Indian Studies, Harvard University
 "In the Himalayan Nights" reviewed by Glen Jennings in Cha: An Asian Literary Journal; by Grady Harp, Top 50 Amazon Reviewer; by Laurie Hanan, Author; by Jane Li, Author; by Christine Wald-Hopkins in Tucson Weekly; by Ekraz Singh in Existere: A Journal of Arts and Literature, York University; by Sukriti Tolani in The Hindustan Times

References

External links
 Scholar's Website
 Today and Tomorrow’s Printers and Publishers
 

Linguists from the United States
American anthropologists
Living people
1937 births
Indian emigrants to the United States
University of California, Berkeley faculty
University of Chicago alumni
University of Arizona faculty